Lepidochrysops ortygia, the koppie blue, is a butterfly of the family Lycaenidae. It is found in South Africa, from the hills in the Eastern Cape, north through the lower parts of Lesotho to the Free State, southern Mpumalanga and Gauteng.

Adults are on wing from October to April, with peaks in December or March depending on rains. There are possibly multiple generations per year.

The larvae feed on Selago geniculata.

References

Butterflies described in 1887
ortygia
Endemic butterflies of South Africa
Taxa named by Roland Trimen